Metrocard is a contactless smartcard ticketing system for public transport services in the Adelaide city and suburbs in South Australia. The system is managed by Adelaide Metro and is usable on their bus, train and tram services.

The contract for the system was tendered out, and in 2010 was awarded to Affiliated Computer Services using technology used in – among others – Montreal, Canada; Houston, Texas; and Toulouse, France. It was originally scheduled to become fully operative in early 2013, however due to overwhelmingly positive response from trial users it was launched on 3 November 2012.

History
The original ticketing system was based on the Crouzet system and was provided by Affiliated Computer Services. It was introduced in 1987 and was intended to be used for only a few years before being replaced. Replacement plans soon fell through and the original equipment remained in use until 2012. In 2010, it was announced that Affiliated Computer Services had been awarded the contract to replace the aging Crouzet system with a new contactless smartcard system, which would also allow the current Edmondson-sized magnetic stripe tickets to remain in use.

As a result of the new system, multi-trip tickets are no longer sold as Crouzet tickets. Metrocards have replaced them, and Seniors tickets have been replaced by the new Seniors Card. Single and day-trip tickets continue to be sold as Edmondson-sized magnetic stripe Metrotickets. Passengers could trade their existing Multitrip Metrotickets in for Metrocard trips. From December 2014, validators no longer accepted Multitrip tickets, however users could continue to convert them to Metrocard Trips until 28 February 2015.

In 2013, it was announced that Metrocards would be able to be used to access secure bike cages, at railway stations fitted with the necessary equipment, for an annual fee. It was also announced that, as part of the Tea Tree Plaza Interchange park & ride upgrade, Metrocard users would be able to use their Metrocard to pay for parking.

There are also student and senior metrocards available. Furthermore, passengers can buy a 14 or 28-day pass and put it on their metrocard.

Equipment

Validators
There are two kinds of validators: dual-purpose and Metrocard-only. Dual-purpose validators have been installed on all buses, trains and trams and will accept both Metrocards and Crouzet tickets. Metrocard-only validators have been installed alongside the dual-purpose validators on the 3000 class railcars and the Alstom Citadis trams and at secondary doors on the larger O-Bahn buses. Both validators feature indicator lights and an LCD display showing information to users such as ticket type, debited value and credit balance (if any), and errors.

Vending Machines

Located on every train and tram is a vending machine used for the purchase of single trip and day trip tickets. The vending machines can also recharge Metrocards. The machines accept coins and card payments, but not bills, which was a common criticism of the previous generation ticket vending machines.

The ticket vending machines have a touchscreen display for passengers to choose the appropriate fare and payment method, and upon payment the machine dispenses a validated ticket for the passenger. Passengers paying using a debit or credit card interact with the PIN pad located towards the centre to process payment.

A similar version of the vending machines is located at several of the city tram stops, the Adelaide Metro InfoCentres, and some major interchanges that will only recharge Metrocards and accept EFTPOS payments.

Metrocard Vending Machine
These ticket machines are located in the main passenger concourse at Adelaide railway station and in the public bus stop shelter at Adelaide Airport. They differ from other ticket vending machines in that they both dispense and recharge Metrocards.

These machines have a larger touchscreen, allowing for selection of different ticket types and payment methods.

Payment methods accepted by this machine are coins (except 5c pieces), bills (except $50 and $100 bills), and EFTPOS.

See also

 Electronic money
 List of smart cards
 Oyster card
 Octopus card
 myki
 Opal card

References

Fare collection systems in Australia
Transport in Adelaide
2012 establishments in Australia